In Unicode, a script is a collection of letters and other written signs used to represent textual information in one or more writing systems. Some scripts support one and only one writing system and language, for example, Armenian. Other scripts support many different writing systems; for example, the Latin script supports English, French, German, Italian, Vietnamese, Latin itself, and several other languages. Some languages make use of multiple alternate writing systems and thus also use several scripts; for example, in Turkish, the Arabic script was used before the 20th century but transitioned to Latin in the early part of the 20th century. For a list of languages supported by each script, see the list of languages by writing system. More or less complementary to scripts are symbols and Unicode control characters.

The unified diacritical characters and unified punctuation characters frequently have the "common" or "inherited" script property. However, the individual scripts often have their own punctuation and diacritics, so that many scripts include not only letters but also diacritic and other marks, punctuation, numerals and even their own idiosyncratic symbols and space characters.

Unicode 15.0 defines 161 separate scripts, including 94 modern scripts and 67 ancient or historic scripts. More scripts are in the process for encoding or have been tentatively allocated for encoding in roadmaps.

Definition and classification 

When multiple languages make use of the same script, there are frequently some differences, particularly in diacritics and other marks. For example, Swedish and English both use the Latin script. However, Swedish includes the character å (sometimes called a Swedish O), while English has no such character. Nor does English make use of the diacritic combining ring above for any character. In general, the languages sharing the same scripts share many of the same characters. Despite these peripheral differences in the Swedish and English writing systems, they are said to use the same Latin script. Thus, the Unicode abstraction of scripts is a basic organizing technique. The differences among different alphabets or writing systems remain and are supported through Unicode’s flexible scripts, combining marks and collation algorithms.

Script versus writing system 

Writing system is sometimes treated as a synonym for "script". However, it also can be used as the specific concrete writing system supported by a script. For example, the Vietnamese writing system is supported by the Latin script. A writing system may also cover more than one script; for example, the Japanese writing system makes use of the Han, Hiragana and Katakana scripts.

Most writing systems can be broadly divided into several categories: logographic, syllabic, alphabetic (or segmental), abugida, abjad and featural; however, all features of any of these may be found in any given writing system in varying proportions, often making it difficult to purely categorize a system. The term complex system is sometimes used to describe those where the admixture makes classification problematic.

Unicode supports all of these types of writing systems through its numerous scripts. Unicode also adds further properties to characters to help differentiate the various characters and the ways they behave within Unicode text-processing algorithms.

Special script property values 
In addition to explicit or specific script properties, Unicode uses three special values:
Common Unicode can assign a character in the UCS to a single script only. However, many characters—those that are not part of a formal natural-language writing system or are unified across many writing systems—may be used in more than one script (for example, currency signs, symbols, numerals and punctuation marks). In these cases Unicode defines them as belonging to the "common" script (ISO 15924 code "Zyyy").
Inherited Many diacritics and non-spacing combining characters may be applied to characters from more than one script. In these cases Unicode assigns them to the "inherited" script (ISO 15924 code Zinh), which means that they have the same script class as the base character with which they combine, and so in different contexts they may be treated as belonging to different scripts. In the former case, it inherits the Latin script of the base character, whereas in the latter case, it inherits the Cyrillic script of the base character.
Unknown The value of "unknown" script (ISO 15924 code Zzzz) is given to unassigned, private-use, noncharacter, and surrogate code points.

Character categories within scripts 
Unicode provides a general category property for each character. So in addition to belonging to a script every character also has a general category. Typically scripts include letter characters including: uppercase letters, lowercase letter and modifier letters. Some characters are considered titlecase letters for a few precomposed ligatures such as ǲ (U+01F2). Such titlecase ligatures are all in the Latin and Greek scripts and are all compatibility characters, and therefore Unicode discourages their use by authors. It is unlikely that new titlecase letters will be added in the future.

Most writing systems do not differentiate between uppercase and lowercase letters. For those scripts all letters are categorized as "other letter" or "modifier letter". Ideographs such as Unihan ideographs are also categorized as "other letters".  A few scripts do differentiate between uppercase and lowercase however: Latin, Cyrillic, Greek, Armenian, Georgian, and Deseret. Even for these scripts there are some letters that are neither uppercase nor lowercase.

Scripts can also contain any other general category character such as marks (diacritic and otherwise), numbers (numerals), punctuation, separators (word separators such as spaces), symbols and non-graphical format characters. These are included in a particular script when they are unique to that script. Other such characters are generally unified and included in the punctuation or diacritic blocks. However, the bulk of characters in any script (other than the common and inherited scripts) are letters.

List of scripts in Unicode 
Unicode defines over a hundred script names (called "Alias" or "Property value alias"), based on the ISO 15924 list.
Unicode uses the "Common" script name for ISO 15924's Zyyy (code for undetermined script), "Inherited" for ISO 15924's Zinh (code for inherited script), and "Unknown" for ISO 15924's Zzzz (code for uncoded script). Not used are, among others, the ISO 15924 script codes: Zsym (Symbols) and Zmth (Mathematical notation). These are considered not to be scripts in Unicode sense.

Missing scripts in Unicode 
With each new version of Unicode, new writing systems are added to the international character code. According to a statement by linguist Dr Deborah Anderson of UC Berkeley, there are over 100 writing systems that have not yet been included in Unicode.

According to a list of the project Missing Scripts by the University of Applied Sciences Mainz, Germany, the ANRT Nancy, France and UC Berkeley, USA, there are 294 known writing systems of mankind according to the current state of research (January 2022). 131 of them have not yet been encoded in Unicode, i.e. cannot yet be used on a computer or mobile phone.

See also
Latin script in Unicode
Unicode characters
Unicode symbols
Phonemic and phonetic orthography

References

External links
 Script Encoding Initiative, A project at UC Berkeley, USA, working to get more scripts included in the Unicode standard.
 The World’s Writing Systems, An overview of all 294 known writing systems, each with a typographic reference glyph and their Unicode status.

Scripts